Piraziz is a town and a district of Giresun Province on the Black Sea coast of Turkey.

Piraziz used to be a part of the neighbouring Bulancak district for much of its history, until it was promoted into being its own district in 1988. The urban area is home to 6,886 people, a good half of the district's population (2018: 56.8%).

Etymology 
In the Ottoman Empire period, the town was named Piridede-Abdal.

Economy 
The local economy depends on growing hazelnuts and fishing in the Black Sea.  

Due to the poor economic conditions of the region, many people have migrated away to  find better paying jobs in other parts of Turkey.

References

External links

  the municipality
 photographs of Piraziz

Populated places in Giresun Province
Fishing communities in Turkey
Populated coastal places in Turkey
Districts of Giresun Province
Towns in Turkey